Warning is the fifth full-length studio album by Polish grindcore band Antigama. It was released on 3 March 2009 on Relapse Records.

Overview
Warning was recorded in September 2008. A music video was released for "Disconnected". The music video was shot at the Progresja Club in Warsaw, Poland, with producer and director Bartek Rogalewicz. Shortly after the release, Antigama was part of the first European edition of Relapse Records' Contamination Tour alongside Origin, Skinless, Obscura, and Man Must Die.

Track listing
 "Disconnected" – 1:14
 "Jealousy" – 1:33
 "City" – 2:32
 "Another" – 1:26
 "Not True" – 1:12
 "War" – 2:13
 "Heartbeat" – 2:11
 "Preachers Pray" – 2:17
 "Sequenzia Dellamorte" – 1:32
 "You Have The Right to Remain Violent" – 1:37
 "Lost Skull" – 2:53
 "Nightmare" – 2:50
 "Paganini Meets Barbapapex" – 1:54
 "Empty Room" – 2:15
 "Orange Pills" – 1:04
 "Black Planet" – 7:02

Personnel
 Patryk Zwolinski – vocals
 Sebastian Rokicki – guitar
 Szymon Czech – bass
 Krzysztof Bentkowski – drums

References

External links
 Official Antigama Myspace
 Official Relapse Records Website

2009 albums
Antigama albums
Relapse Records albums